Edward L. Kluska (1917 – April 20, 1996) was an American football coach. He served as the head football coach at the Xavier University from 1947 to 1954, compiling a record of 42–33–4.  He died following a stroke on April 20, 1996, at Good Samaritan Hospital in Cincinnati, Ohio.

Head coaching record

College

References

1917 births
1996 deaths
Xavier Musketeers baseball players
Xavier Musketeers football coaches
Xavier Musketeers football players
Xavier Musketeers men's basketball players
High school football coaches in Ohio
People from Mount Pleasant, Pennsylvania
Players of American football from Pennsylvania
Baseball players from Pennsylvania
Basketball players from Pennsylvania